Lee Pa-ni (born January 22, 1986) is a South Korean model and actress. In 2006, she was selected as the winner of Spice TV’s Playboy 2006 Korea Model Contest. She is often reported to be the first Korean model to appear in the magazine; however, that distinction goes to Lee Sa-bi.

See also
List of South Korean models
Contemporary culture of South Korea

References

External links
 
 

1986 births
South Korean female models
Living people